"All that glitters is not gold" is an aphorism stating that not everything that looks precious or true turns out to be so.

While early expressions of the idea are known from at least the 12th–13th century, the current saying is derived from a 16th-century line by William Shakespeare, "All that glisters is not gold".

Origins
The expression, in various forms, originated in or before the 12th century and may date back to Æsop.
The Latin is Non omne quod nitet aurum est. The French monk Alain de Lille wrote "Do not hold everything gold that shines like gold" in 1175.

Chaucer gave two early versions in English: "But al thyng which that shyneth as the gold / Nis nat gold, as that I have herd it told" in "The Canon's Yeoman's Tale", and "Hyt is not al golde that glareth" in "The House of Fame".

The popular form of the expression is a derivative of a line in William Shakespeare's play The Merchant of Venice, which employs the word "glisters," a 16th-century synonym for "glitters." The line comes from a secondary plot of the play, in the scroll inside the golden casket the puzzle of Portia's boxes (Act II – Scene VII – Prince of Morocco):

Glitters or glisters
The original version of the saying used the word glisters, but glitters long ago became the predominant form. Poet John Dryden used glitter in his 1687 poem The Hind and the Panther. The words glister and glitter have the same meaning.

Arthur Golding in his 1577 English translation of John Calvin's sermons on Ephesians uses the phrase "But al is not gold that glistereth" in sermon 15.

In 1747, Thomas Gray paraphrased the saying in his Ode on the Death of a Favourite Cat, Drowned in a Tub of Goldfishes which finishes with the lines:

In popular culture
In H.M.S Pinafore, an 1878 comic opera by Gilbert and Sullivan, the phrase appears as "all that glitters is not gold."

In 1901, sheet music publishers M. Witmark & Sons released "All That Glitters Is Not Gold", featuring words by George A. Norton and music by James W. Casey. The song is perhaps best remembered today for its inclusion in Bowery Bugs (1949), a Bugs Bunny cartoon based on the story of Steve Brodie.

The phrase is referenced with a reversal of the usual meaning in J. R. R. Tolkien's poem "The Riddle of Strider", originally written for The Fellowship of the Ring:

The poem emphasizes that sometimes gold is hidden or mistaken for something else, as opposed to gaudy facades being mistaken for real gold. Strider, secretly the rightful king of Gondor, appears to be a mere Ranger. Fundamentally, both Tolkien's phrase and the original ask the reader to look beneath the skin, rather than judging on outward look alone.

Led Zeppelin reference the phrase in the opening line of their 1971 hit Stairway to Heaven: "There's a lady who's sure all that glitters is gold".

Neil Young used the phrase in his song "Don't Be Denied" ("Well, all that glitters isn't gold/I know you've heard that story told"), from his 1973 album Time Fades Away, to express his "realization that even success wouldn't make him happy", even after he obtained fame and money.

In the 1973 single Get Up, Stand Up by The Wailers, Bob Marley and Peter Tosh used the phrase in the first verse to reflect the themes of the song - namely the critiques of colonialism and Christianity, and their roles in creating a feeling of resignation among the African diaspora contrary to their values and beliefs:

Boz Scaggs' song You Make it so Hard (to Say No) from the 1974 album Slow Dancer features the line "All that glitters is not gold/Just like good jokes get old".

In 1995, V.C. Andrews published a novel called All That Glitters, which in turn inspired the 2015 Nicole Dollanganger song, White Trashing. The novel was also adapted in 2021 by the Lifetime network into a made-for-TV film

A deviation from the phrase can be found in the song Posthuman by Marilyn Manson, released on the 1998 album Mechanical Animals, whose lyrics include the line "All that glitters is cold".

Smash Mouth reference the phrase in the chorus of their 1999 signature song, All Star: "All that glitters is gold/Only shooting stars break the mold".

In the 2006 SpongeBob SquarePants episode "All That Glitters," SpongeBob gives a brief soliloquy of the Shakespearean quote directly to the audience.

Gabrielle Aplin’s song Keep on Walking from her 2013 album English Rain includes the lyrics "All that glitters is not gold/From these bruises flowers grow".

See also

 "Gods of the Copybook Headings" – a poem reflecting on eternal truths amid human pretensions, by Rudyard Kipling
"Things are seldom what they seem" – song in Gilbert and Sullivan's HMS Pinafore, where Little Buttercup alludes to Captain Corcoran's low birth by singing of things that may appear as one thing whilst being another, including the line "All that glitters is not gold".
 "Ode on the Death of a Favourite Cat, Drowned in a Tub of Gold Fishes" – poem by Thomas Gray which ends "Nor all, that glisters, gold"

References

External links
Context of Shakespeare's quote at enotes.com

English proverbs
Aphorisms
Shakespearean phrases